Lawalong Wildlife Sactuary is located in the Lawalong CD block in the Chatra subdivision of the Chatra district in the state of Jharkhand, India.

History
Lawalong Wildlife Sanctuary was earlier under the control of the Raja of Ramgarh and other landlords in the area. The government took charge in 1924 and in 1947 it became a private protected forest. The ownership vested with the Government of Bihar in 1953. In earlier days, the presence of wildlife in high numbers in these forests attracted hunters from all over the country. One of the owners of this area, the Tikait of Kunda Estate used to organise “shikar” from time to time, in a big way. Subsequently, hunting was completely banned under the Wildlife Protection Act 1972. There are 64 villages in the sanctuary area and the people of these villages have certain rights and privileges, as for example grazing cattle and collecting firewood.

Geography

Location                                                                  
The sanctuary is surrounded by the Amanat River in the south, the Chako River in the west and the Lilajan River in the north-east.

Lawalong Wildlife Sanctuary is about 35 km from Chatra. The Gaya-Ranchi state highway passes near the Lawalong sanctuary on its eastern side. There is a road connecting the Gaya-Ranchi state highway and leads to Lawalong village and passes through the sanctuary area. The Hazaribagh-Simaria-Bagra Mor P.W.D. Road leads to Lawalong, where the Beat office of Lawalong Beat of Wild Life Sanctuary is situated. The buses for Lawalong and Kunda ply on these roads and halts at important places like Lutidih, Bagra Mor etc. The nearest large railway station is at Daltonganj, 50 km away.

Note: The map alongside presents some of the notable locations in the district. All places marked in the map are linked in the larger full screen map.

Forests
The forests in the sanctuary are classified as Northern Tropical Dry Deciduous Forests. The forests are miscellaneous in nature and the canopy is moderately close with trees attaining good height and diameter growth. The ‘sal’ tree is found all over the sanctuary.

Wildlife
The main mammalian species in the sanctuary are: Rhesus macaque (Hindi: bandar), common langur, Indian elephant, sambhar, leopard, spotted deer (Hindi: cheetal), barking deer (Hindi: kotra), sloth bear (Hindi: bhalu), jungle cat, common mongoose (Hindi:newla), and the dhole (Hindi: kola).

Birds: common pea fowl, patridges, quails, hornbills and vultures.

Stay and visits
There is a forest rest house at Lawalong, used by both the forest executives/ staff and tourists. As of 2020, the area has problems with Maoist activists.

References

Chota Nagpur dry deciduous forests
Wildlife sanctuaries in Jharkhand
Chatra district
Protected areas established in 1978
1978 establishments in Bihar